Paul Dale Devenport (born 19 March 1966) is a semi-retired professional golfer from New Zealand.

Born in Wellington, New Zealand, Devenport grew up in Paraparaumu Beach where his house backed onto the 13th hole of the Paraparaumu Beach Club.  After playing amateur golf in Wellington, he was offered a full golf scholarship from Houston Baptist University in Houston, Texas.  He later transferred to the University of Louisiana at Lafayette to finish his Business Degree before turning pro in 1991.

Devenport joined the PGA Tour of Australasia in 1993, but has had most success on the Canadian Tour where he has won four times, including twice in 2001. His final win was the 2001 Shell Payless Open, where he was victorious a few weeks after the death of his mother. Devenport is also known for performing magic and sleight-of-hand tricks to entertain crowds at golf tournaments. His last full season on tour was 2004.

Amateur wins
1984 New Zealand Under-23 Championship

Professional wins (4)

Canadian Tour wins (4)

Team appearances
World Cup (representing New Zealand): 1996

References

External links

New Zealand male golfers
Houston Christian Huskies men's golfers
Louisiana Ragin' Cajuns men's golfers
New Zealand expatriates in Canada
Sportspeople from Wellington City
People from Paraparaumu
Sportspeople from Victoria, British Columbia
1966 births
Living people